Thomas Carlos Umaga-Jensen (born 31 December 1997) is a New Zealand rugby union player who plays for the  in the Super Rugby competition. Thomas has been on the radar since high school where he and his twin brother Peter Umaga-Jensen were stand-outs in the Scots College 1st XV for several years. Umaga-Jensen was a member of the winning New Zealand U20s team that travelled to Georgia in 2017 and convincingly beat England U20s in the final.  His position of choice is Second Five-Eighth. In 2020 He moved to Otago.

Family
Thomas's brother Peter Umaga-Jensen has also represented Wellington at rugby at senior level. They are the nephews of former All Black captain Tana Umaga and All Black star Jerry Collins

References 

1997 births
New Zealand rugby union players
New Zealand sportspeople of Samoan descent
Living people
Rugby union players from Lower Hutt
Rugby union centres
Wellington rugby union players
Highlanders (rugby union) players
Otago rugby union players